The 2008 Intercontinental Rally Challenge season was the third season of the Intercontinental Rally Challenge. The season consisted of ten rounds and began on April 4, with the Istanbul Rally. The season ended on December 12 with the China Rally. Nicolas Vouilloz won the title ahead of Freddy Loix and Giandomenico Basso.

Calendar

Selected entries

Drivers standings
 The best seven scores from each driver count towards the championship.

Intercontinental Rally Challenge seasons
Intercontinental Rally Challenge